Tsing Yi Park is a public park on the Tsing Yi Island, Hong Kong with Tsing Yi Estate, Tsing Yi Garden, Broadview Garden and St. Paul's Village in its proximity. It was opened to the public in September 1996, with area of 7.09 hectares, the park was organised by the Leisure and Cultural Service Department. It locates at 60 Tsing King Road and it is under Kwai Tsing District. The park features a pond with many turles and trees and much nature. The park was designed to have a pure European style.

See also
 List of urban public parks and gardens in Hong Kong

External links

 Information on the Park

Urban public parks and gardens in Hong Kong
Tsing Yi